Footi is a vegetable and tomato sauce from Senegal (Senegalese cuisine). It is also eaten in Guinean cuisine.

References

Senegalese cuisine